Qaleh-ye Rahim (also Romanized as Qal‘eh-ye Raḩīm and Qal‘eh Raḩīm) is a village in Beyranvand-e Jonubi Rural District, Bayravand District, Khorramabad County, Lorestan Province, Iran. At the 2006 census, its population was 235, in 52 families.

References 

Towns and villages in Khorramabad County